The Reformists are a political faction in Iran. Iran's "reform era" is sometimes said to have lasted from 1997 to 2005—the length of President Mohammad Khatami's two terms in office. The Council for Coordinating the Reforms Front is the main umbrella organization and coalition within the movement; however, there are reformist groups not aligned with the council, such as the Reformists Front.

Background

Organizations
The 2nd of Khordad Movement usually refers not only to the coalition of 18 groups and political parties of the reforms front but to anyone else who was a supporter of the 1997 reform programs of Khatami. The ideology of Khatami and the movement is based on Islamic democracy.

The reforms front consists of several political parties, some of the most famous including the following

 Islamic Iran Participation Front: key figures are Mohammad Reza Khatami, Saeed Hajjarian, Alireza Alavitabar, Abbas Abdi, Mohsen Safaie-Farahani, Mohsen Aminzadeh, and Mostafa Tajzadeh. It has been described as the dominant member within the 2nd of Khordad Front, the "main reformist party", and the party most closely associated with President Khatami.
 Association of Combatant Clerics (Majma'e Rowhaniyoon-e Mobarez): key figures are Mohammad Khatami, Hadi Khamenei, Majid Ansari, Mohammad Tavassoli, and Mohammad Mousavi Khoeiniha. It has been described as the "main 'reformist' clerical body."
 Mojahedin of the Islamic Revolution of Iran Organization (Sāzmān-e Mojāhedin-e Enqelāb-e Eslāmi-e Irān): key figures are Behzad Nabavi, Mohsen Armin, Mohammad Salevati, and Feyzollah Arabsorkhi. The mojahedin have been called a "key political group."

Ideas 
Many Iranian intellectuals were involved in establishing a foundation for the movement. Perhaps the most influential figure was Abdolkarim Soroush. For many years, he was the only voice publicly criticizing the regime's policies. His regular lectures at Tehran University used to enjoy the attendance of many of the Iranian students who later generated the 2nd of Khordad movement. Many famous figures of the movement belong to the Soroush circle. However, at the rise of 2nd of Khordad movement, Saeed Hajjarian acted as the main theorist behind the movement and the main strategist in Khatami's camp.

The movement has been described as changing the key terms in public discourse: emperialism (imperialism), mostazafen (poor), jehad (jihad), mojahed (mujahideen), shahed (martyrdom), khish (roots), enqelab (revolution) and Gharbzadegi (Western intoxication), to some modern terms and concepts like: demokrasi (democracy), moderniyat (modernity), azadi (liberty), barabari (equality), jam'eh-e madani (civil society), hoquq-e beshar (human rights), mosharekat-e siyasi (political participation), Shahrvandi (citizenship), etc.

Supporters
The core of the reform movement is said to be made up of Islamic leftists disqualified for running for office as they were purged and generally disempowered by Islamic conservatives following the death of Ayatollah Ruhollah Khomeini in 1989. Islamic leftists turned reformists include Abdolkarim Soroush, Saeed Hajjarian, Akbar Ganji, Ali Akbar Mohtashami-Pur, Ebrahim Asgharzadeh, Mohsen Mirdamadi, Mir-Hossein Mousavi, and the Anjoman-e-Eslami (Islamic Association) and Office for Strengthening Unity student groups.

Many institutions support the movement of reformation such as organizations like Organization of the Mojahedin of the Islamic Revolution (OMIR) and the Majma’a Rohaneeyoon Mobarez or the Forum of the Militant Clergy, or Office for Fostering Unity and Freedom Movement of Iran. There were also many media outlets in support like the Iran-e-farda and kian magazinez.

Khatami's support is said to have cut across regions and class lines with even some members of the Islamic Revolutionary Guard Corps, Qom seminarians and Basij members voting for him. The core of his electoral support, however, came from the modern middle class, college students, women, and urban workers. For example, by 1995, about half of Iran's 60.5 million people were too young to be alive at the time of the Islamic Revolution.

Major events

1997 presidential election 

The movement began with the May 23, 1997, surprise victory of Mohammad Khatami, "a little known cleric", to the presidency on with almost 70% of the vote. Khatami's win was credited largely to the votes of women and youth who voted for him because he promised to improve the status of women and respond to the demands of the younger generation in Iran. Another reflection of the enthusiasm for reform was that voter turnout was 80%, compared to 50% in the last presidential election in which there had been no reformist candidate.

Khatami is regarded as Iran's first reformist president, since the focus of his campaign was on the rule of law, democracy and the inclusion of all Iranians in the political decision-making process.

Assassination attempt on Saeed Hajjarian
Very soon after the rise of the 2nd of Khordad movement, there was an attempted assassination of Saeed Hajjarian the main strategist of the reformist camp. In March, 2000, he was shot in the face on the doorstep of Tehran's city council by a gunman who fled on a motor-cycle with an accomplice. The bullet entered through his left cheek and lodged in his neck. He was not killed but was "badly paralyzed" for some time. During his coma, groups of young Iranians kept a vigil outside Sina hospital, where he was being treated. Due to this injury, Hajjarian now uses a walking frame, and his voice is distorted.

His convicted assailant Saeed Asgar, a young man who was reported to be a member of the Basij militia, served only a small part of his 15-year jail sentence.

Ganji and Red Eminence and Grey Eminences 
Red Eminence and Grey Eminences ( "Alijenabe Sorkhpoosh, Alijenabane Khakestari") is name of series of newspaper articles and a book written by Akbar Ganji under the responsibility of Saeed Hajjarian, in which he criticized former President Rafsanjani as the "Red Eminence" and the intelligence officers in his government, such as Ali Fallahian as the "Grey Eminences". His subsequent prosecution and conviction for "anti-Islamic activities" for his role in the publication of the book and articles cost Akbar Ganji six years of imprisonment.

1999 local elections
Reformist candidates did remarkably well in the 1999 local elections and received 75% of the vote.

18th of Tir crisis (1999)

The 18th of Tir (July 9) crisis, refers to a demonstration in Tehran University dormitory in reaction to closing Salam newspaper by the government. Demonstrations continued for a few days in most cities in Iran and in more than ninety-five countries worldwide. The demonstration ended in violence and the death of a young Iranian citizen along with many casualties. At the time, it was Iran's biggest antigovernment demonstrations since the 1979 Islamic revolution.
After attacking of the students of Tehran University by hardline vigilante group, Khatami delivered a speech three month later while defending of his reform programme and at the same time he insisted on the foundations of his government. He referred to the reformation of system from within with holding two elements of Islamic and republic.

18th of Tir national day of protest (2003) 
In 2003, Iran's leading pro-democracy student group, the Daftar-e Tahkim-e-Vahdat called for a national day of protest on the 18th of Tir to commemorate the original 1999 protest. At least one observer believes it was the failure of this protest that "delivered a fatal blow to the reform movement."

According to journalist Afshin Molavi, many Iranians hoped the day would lead to an uprising that would "break the back" of the hardliners, but instead the Islamic Republic "employed violence, intimidation, and sophisticated carrot-and-stick approach to suck the wind out of the demonstrations." In addition to a show of force and numerous checkpoints, the state used sophisticated jamming technology to black out satellite all the television feed and allowed the holding of (rare) outdoor pop concerts to draw young people away from the demonstrations. Dartar-e Tahkim-e-Vahdat also hurt its cause by calling for foreigners, the UN,- to assist it against the government.

6th Parliament (2000)
In the Iranian parliamentary elections, 2000 to elect the 6th parliament, reformist enjoyed a majority (69.25%), or 26.8 million, of the 38.7 million voters who cast ballots in the February 18, 2000 first round. Ultimately reformists won 195 of the 290 Majlis seats in that election.

7th Parliament (2004)
In January 2004, shortly before the 2004 Iranian legislative elections (the 7th Parliament), the conservative Council of Guardians ended Iranian voters' continued support for reformists by taking the unprecedented step of banning about 2500 candidates, nearly half of the total, including 80 sitting Parliament deputies. More than 100 MPs resigned in protest and critics complained the move "shattered any pretense of Iranian democracy".

27 Khordad presidential election (2005)
In the 27 Khordad presidential election (June 17, 2005), Mostafa Moin and Mehdi Karroubi were the main candidates of the 2nd of Khordad movement. However, neither made it to the second round of the election (the final runoff): Moin came in fifth and Karroubi third in the first round. As a result, many supporters of the reform movement lost hope and did not participate in the election.

2009 Iranian presidential election

The two leading reformist candidates in the 2009 presidential election were Mir-Hossein Mousavi and Mehdi Karroubi. Mousavi supporters disbelieved the election results and initiated a series of protests that lasted several days. After many days of protesting against the election results, the protests eventually turned violent as the Basij (loyal militia to the Islamic Republic) started attacking the protesters and vice versa. Some protesters turned their anger to the government itself and tried to overthrow the Islamic Republic. The protests, in general, lasted up to several months.

Aftermath 
The ultimate lack of success of the movement is described by The Economist magazine:

Dozens of newspapers opened during the Khatami period, only for many to be shut down on one pretext or another by the judiciary. Clerics who took advantage of the new atmosphere to question the doctrine of velayat-e faqih [Islamic government] were imprisoned or otherwise cowed. Even as political debate blossomed, Iran's security services cracked down on religious and ethnic minorities. A number of the government's critics fell victim to murders traced later to the interior ministry. In 1999 police reacted to a peaceful demonstration for freer speech by invading Tehran University, beating and arresting hundreds of students and killing at least one. In the majlis (parliament) much of the president's reforming legislation was vetoed by the Council of Guardians, a committee of clerics appointed by the supreme leader to ensure that laws conform with Islamic precepts.

Saeed Hajjarian, the main theorist behind the movement, declared in 2003 that "the reform movement is dead. Long live the reform movement".

The victory of conservatives in the 2005 presidential election and the 2004 Majlis election can be explained "not so much" by an expansion of "their limited core base as by [their] dividing of the reformers and [their] discouraging them from voting," according to political historian Ervand Abrahamian. The conservatives won in part because they retained their 25% base; in part because they recruited war veterans to run as their candidates; in part because they wooed independents on the issue of national security; but in most part because large numbers of women, college students, and other members of the salaried middle class stayed home. Turnout in the Majles elections fell below 51% - one of the worst since the revolution. In Tehran, it fell to 28%.

Criticism

The reform movement has been criticized as "too divided to establish its own political authority, too naïve about the tenacity of the authoritarian elite around Khamenei, and too inflexible to circumvent the ban on political parties in Iran by creating and sustaining alternative forms of mobilisation." In addition, leaders of the reform movement lacked a clear and coherent strategy of establishing durable and extensive linkages with the public.

Ironically, they became a victim of their electoral successes. The reform movement's "control of both the presidency and parliament from 2000 to 2004 made it look inept and a part of the corrupt system in the eyes of many Iranians."<ref>Gunes Murat Tezcur, ''Muslim Reformers in Iran and Turkey: The Paradox of Moderation, University of Texas Press, 2010, p. 140.</ref>

 Secularism 
BBC journalist Jonathan Beale reports that since secularism is banned in Iran, it is an ideology that is mostly followed by political organizations among the Iranian diaspora or by many of the anti-sharia political parties in exile that are secular. These parties promote regime change, most often with foreign aid and military intervention (particularity from the United States). He quotes a former leader of the Iranian Revolutionary Guards, Mohsen Sazegara (also one of its founders), as saying, "Don't interfere. Leave these affairs to the Iranian people". Sazegara believes the US should call for democracy and freedom, and let Iranian opposition groups inside Iran, which are Reformists, take the lead, instead of attempting to create an opposition in exile.

Referendum movement
The Referendum movement calls in effect for a rerun of the 1979 referendum that established the Islamic Republic in Iran: "a 'yes or no' vote on whether today's Iranians still want the authoritarian Islamic Republic that another generation's revolution brought them." It is said to have been born out of "the ashes of the failures of Khatami's Islamic democracy movement" and reflected in one-word graffiti on walls in Tehran saying "no". It has been criticized as calling for complete system change without "building the political and organisational network to back it up" and inviting a brutal crackdown, with "no means on the ground to resist it".

Election results

President

 Coalition organizations 

 Reformists' Supreme Council for Policymaking 
On 8 November 2015, the establishment of the council was announced. It oversees the Council for Coordinating the Reforms Front, which its rotating head serves as the deputy head of the council for policymaking. Moderation and Development Party joined the council in April 2017. Some members of the council include:
 Mohammad-Reza Aref (Head)
 Abdolvahed Mousavi Lari (Deputy)
 Mahmoud Sadeghi (ex-officio deputy as head of the Coordinating Council)
 Elaheh Koulaei (Secretary)
 Elham Fakhari (Secretary)
 Hassan Rasouli
 Mohsen Rohami
 Seyed Mahmoud Mirlohi
 Ali Soufi

 Council for Coordinating the Reforms Front 

 Reformists Front 

 Parliamentary leaders 

 Parties 

 Assembly of the Forces of Imam's Line
 Association of Combatant Clerics
 Democracy Party
 Executives of Construction Party
 Islamic Iran Solidarity Party
 Islamic Labour Party
 National Trust Party
 NEDA Party
 Popular Party of Reforms

 Union of Islamic Iran People Party
 Will of the Iranian Nation Party
 Association of the Women of the Islamic Republic
 Islamic Assembly of Ladies
 Islamic Iran Participation Front (banned)

 Organizations 

 Assembly of Qom Seminary Scholars and Researchers
 Islamic Association of Teachers
 Islamic Association of Engineers
 Islamic Association of University Instructors
 Islamic Association of Iranian Medical Society

 Office for Strengthening Unity
 Worker House
 Mojahedin of the Islamic Revolution of Iran Organization (banned)

 Media Aftab YazdEtemaadSharghAsr-e MaaAsrarAyande-ye NoBaharEbtekarHam-MihanHayat-e-NoHambastegiKhordadYas-e NoZanMosharekat''

See also

 Human rights in Islamic Republic of Iran
 History of principle-ism in Iran
 Chain murders of Iran
 Iranian Economic Reform Plan

References

History of the Islamic Republic of Iran
History of civil rights and liberties in Iran
Iranian democracy movements
Islamic democracy
Liberal and progressive movements within Islam
Political factions in Iran
Reform in Iran
Republicanism in Iran